Eric Asomani (born 8 September 1999) is a Belgian footballer.

Personal life
Born in Belgium, Asomani is of Ghanaian descent.

References

Living people
1999 births
Association football midfielders
Belgian footballers
Belgian people of Ghanaian descent
S.K. Beveren players
Belgian Pro League players
Sportspeople from Namur (city)
Footballers from Namur (province)